Gumby is an American clay animation franchise, centered on the titular green clay humanoid character created and modeled by Art Clokey. Gumby stars in two television series, the feature-length Gumby: The Movie, and other media. He immediately became a famous example of stop motion clay animation and an American cultural icon, spawning tributes, parodies, and merchandising.

Overview
The Gumby franchise follows Gumby's adventures through different environments and historical eras. His primary sidekick is Pokey, a talking orange pony. His nemeses are the G and J Blockheads, a pair of antagonistic red humanoid figures with cube-shaped heads, one with the letter G on the block, the other with the letter J. Their creation was inspired by the trouble-making Katzenjammer Kids. Other characters include Prickle, a yellow fire-breathing dinosaur who sometimes styles himself as a detective with pipe and deerstalker hat like Sherlock Holmes; Goo, a flying blue shapeshifting mermaid who spits blue goo balls; Gumbo and Gumba, Gumby's parents; and Nopey, Gumby's dog whose entire vocabulary is the word "nope". The 1988 syndicated series added Gumby's sister Minga, mastodon friend Denali, and chicken friend Tilly.

History

1953–1969: Origins
Gumby was created by Art Clokey in the early 1950s after he finished film school at the University of Southern California (USC).

Clokey's first animated film was a 1953 three-minute student film called Gumbasia, a surreal montage of moving and expanding lumps of clay set to music in a parody of Disney's Fantasia. Gumbasia was created in the "kinesthetic" style taught by Clokey's USC professor Slavko Vorkapić, described as "massaging of the eye cells". Much of Gumby's look and feel was inspired by this technique of camera movements and editing.

In 1955, Clokey showed Gumbasia to film producer Sam Engel, who encouraged him to develop his technique by animating figures into children's stories. Clokey produced a pilot episode starring Gumby.

The name "Gumby" came from the muddy clay found at Clokey's grandparents' farm that his family called "gumbo". Gumby's appearance was inspired by a suggestion from his wife, Ruth (née Parkander), that Gumby be based on the Gingerbread Man. Clokey saw the color green as both racially neutral and a symbol of life. Gumby's legs and feet were made wide to pragmatically ensure that the figure would stand up during stop motion filming. Gumby's slanted head was based on the hairstyle of Clokey's father, Charles Farrington, in an old photograph.

The pilot episode was seen by NBC executive Thomas Warren Sarnoff (the youngest son of RCA and NBC founder, David Sarnoff), who asked Clokey to make another one. The second episode, Gumby on the Moon, became a huge hit on Howdy Doody, so Sarnoff ordered a series in 1955 titled The Gumby Show. In 1955 and 1956, 25 episodes at 11 minutes each aired on NBC. In early episodes, Gumby's voice was provided by Ruth Eggleston, wife of the show's art director Al Eggleston, until Dallas McKennon assumed the role in 1957. Gumby's best friend, an orange pony named Pokey, was introduced during the earliest episodes. Because of its variety format, The Gumby Show features Clokey's animations plus interviews and games. During this time, the show had two successive hosts, Robert Nicholson and Pinky Lee.

In 1959, The Gumby Show entered syndication, and more episodes were produced in the 1960s. Production started in Hollywood and in 1960 moved to a larger studio in Glendora, California, where it remained until production ended in 1969. During this time, Gumby was primarily voiced by Norma MacMillan, and occasionally by Ginny Tyler. The cartoon shorts introduce new characters including a blue mermaid named Goo and a yellow dinosaur named Prickle.

1982–1989: Revival
Beginning in 1982, Gumby was parodied by Eddie Murphy on Saturday Night Live. In it, when the cameras are off, the sweet Gumby reverts to his true self of an irascible, cigar-chomping celebrity who is highly demanding of the production executives. Whenever they refuse his demands, Gumby asserts his star status by saying "I'm Gumby, dammit!" in an exaggerated Jewish accent. According to Joseph Clokey, Art's son, he and Art "thought Eddie was a genius in the way he played that character". In 1987, the original Gumby shorts were released on home video. In 1988, Gumby appeared in The Puppetoon Movie.

This renewed interest led to a new series of 99 episodes of 7-minutes, produced for television syndication in association with Lorimar-Telepictures in 1988. Dallas McKennon voices Gumby in the new adventures, in which Gumby and his pals travels beyond their toyland setting as a musical band. Gumby Adventures includes new characters, such as Gumby's little sister Minga, a mastodon named Denali and a chicken named Tilly.

The new series includes the 1950s and 1960s shorts, with new audio. The voices were re-recorded and the music was replaced by Jerry Gerber's new synthesizer score. Legal issues prevented Clokey from renewing rights to the original Capitol Records production tracks.

1990–2021: feature film and reruns
Starting in 1992, TV channels such as Nickelodeon and Cartoon Network aired reruns of Gumby episodes. In 1995, Clokey's production company produced an independently released theatrical film, Gumby: The Movie, as the character's first feature-length adventure, with John R. Dilworth, creator of Courage the Cowardly Dog, as animation consultant. In it, the villainous Blockheads replace Gumby and his band with robots and kidnap their dog, Lowbelly. It has in-joke homages to science-fiction films such as Star Wars, The Terminator, and 2001: A Space Odyssey. In 1998, the Gumby episode "Robot Rumpus" was featured on Mystery Science Theater 3000.

On March 16, 2007, YouTube announced that all Gumby episodes would appear in their full-length form on its site, digitally remastered and with their original soundtracks. This deal also extended to other video sites, including AOL. In March 2007, KQED-TV broadcast an hour-long documentary Gumby Dharma in its Truly CA series. It details Clokey's life and work, and has new animation of Gumby and Pokey. For these sequences, animator Stephen A. Buckley voiced Gumby and Clokey voiced Pokey.

In 2012, MeTV began airing Gumby in its weekend morning animation block until the end of the year.

In 2014, the VOD service Kabillion Broadcast Gumby

2022–present: Fox ownership
In February 2022, Fox Entertainment, the TV production division of the Murdoch family's Fox Corporation, announced it had acquired the Gumby intellectual property from the estate of Art's son, Joseph Clokey, encompassing all rights including "film, TV and streaming, consumer products, licensing, publishing and all other categories", with plans to launch new series across linear and digital platforms, while adding to the classic Gumby material available on its free streaming platform Tubi.

Cast
Dallas McKennon: Gumby (1957, 1960–1967, 1987–1989, 1995), Pokey (1960–1969), Gumbo (1960–1962), Prickle (1964–1969), Professor Kapp (1964–1989, 1995), Denali (1987–1989), Nopey (1964–1969), Henry (1987 re-dubbed), Rodgy (1987 re-dubbed), Additional voices (1957–1995)
Ginny Tyler: Gumby (1968–1969), Gumba (1957–1962), Granny (1960–1962), Witty Witch (1960–1962), Additional voices (1957–1962)
Norma MacMillan: Gumby (1964–1969), Pokey (1964–1969), Goo (1964–1969), Gumba (1967–1968)
Ruth Eggleston: Gumby (1955–1956), Gumba (1955)
Betty Hartford: Gumba (1956)
Art Clokey: Pokey (1955–1989, 1995), Prickle (1964–1969, 1987–1989, 1995), Gumbo (1955–1989, 1995), Additional voices
Don Messick: Henry (1963), Rodgy (1963), Additional voices
Paul Frees: Professor Kapp (1963), Additional voices
Gloria Clokey: Goo (1987–1989, 1995), Gumba (1987–1989)
Janet MacDuff: Gumba (1987–1989, 1995), Granny (1987–1989), Additional voices (1987–1989, 1995)
Holly Harman: Minga (1987–1989), Tilly (1987–1989), Additional voices
Hal Smith: Prickle (1964–1969), Additional voices (1964–1969)
Taig McNab: Additional voices
Camden Angelis: Additional voices

Several sources say that Dick Beals voiced Gumby in the 1960s; however, Beals denied this claim in a 2001 interview.

Episodes

Reception and legacy
In 1993, TV Guide named Gumby the best cartoon series of the 1950s in its issue celebrating 40 years of television.

Beginning in 1994, the Library of Congress used Gumby as a "spokescharacter" for Adventures into Books: Gumby's World, a traveling exhibition promoting the Center for the Book's national reading campaign from 1997 to 2000. By the end of the 1990s, Gumby and Pokey had also appeared in various commercials for Cheerios cereal.

On August 4, 2006, the Center for Puppetry Arts in Atlanta opened Art Clokey's Gumby: The First Fifty Years. This exhibition featured many of the original puppets and sets, along with screening of Clokey's films. This event was conceived by David Scheve of T.D.A. Animation and Joe Clokey of Premavision, and was one of several exhibits that opened around the country, celebrating the 50th anniversary of The Gumby Show. The children's book Gumby Goes to the Sun was also published that year to commemorate the anniversary. The book was originally created in the 1980s by Clokey's daughter, Holly Harman (who voiced Gumby's sister, Minga in the 1988 series).

In 2007, the Gumby comic book series was nominated for two Eisner Awards, Best New Series and Best Publication for a Young Audience, and won the latter.

On October 12, 2011, a Google Doodle acknowledged Art Clokey's 90th birthday. It was composed of a toy block with a "G" and five clay balls in the Google colors. Clicking each ball revealed the Blockheads, Prickle, Goo, Gumby, and Pokey.

On December 21, 2019, Eddie Murphy reprised his role while hosting SNL during a skit on Weekend Update.

Merchandising 

The most prominent of Gumby merchandise is the bendable figure set by Lakeside Toys. Several single packs and multi-figure sets were made by Jesco (later Trendmasters), and a 50th anniversary collection. There are plush dolls, keychains, mugs, a 1988 Colorforms set, a 1995 Trendmasters playset, and a Kubricks set by Medicom. A tribute album, Gumby: The Green Album, produced by Shepard Stern, was released in 1989.

In August 2005, the first video game featuring Gumby, Gumby vs. the Astrobots, was released by Namco for the Game Boy Advance. Gumby must rescue Pokey, Prickle, and Goo after they are captured by the Blockheads and their cohorts, the Astrobots.

The Gumby images and toys are registered trademarks of Prema Toy Company. Premavision owned the distribution rights to the Gumby cartoons, having been reverted from previous distributor Warner Bros. Television in 2003, and had licensed the rights to Classic Media until September 30, 2012. At this time, Classic Media was officially acquired by DreamWorks Animation and branded as DreamWorks Classics, which became a subsidiary of NBCUniversal in 2016. As of April 2015, NCircle Entertainment owns home video and digital distribution rights to the cartoons.

See also

List of films featuring clay animation
Morph
Semper Gumby
Davey and Goliath

References

External links

Premavision/Clokey Productions 

Gumby at Don Markstein's Toonopedia. Archived from the original on September 1, 2016.

Mass media franchises introduced in 1953
1950s American animated television series
1960s American animated television series
1980s American animated television series
1955 American television series debuts
1957 American television series endings
1960 American television series debuts
1969 American television series endings
1988 American television series debuts
1988 American television series endings
American children's animated adventure television series
American children's animated fantasy television series
American culture
American television series revived after cancellation
Clay animation television series
English-language television shows
Television series about shapeshifting
Television series about size change
Television characters introduced in 1955
Fictional characters who can duplicate themselves
Fictional characters who can stretch themselves
Fictional characters who can turn intangible
Fictional humanoids
First-run syndicated television programs in the United States
NBC original programming
Sentient toys in fiction
Stop motion characters
Television shows adapted into comics
Television shows adapted into films
Television shows adapted into video games
Television series by Lorimar-Telepictures
Television series by Fox Entertainment